Harold O'Neill (15 November 1894 – 1971) was an English professional footballer who played as a full back. He played in the Football League for Sheffield Wednesday, Bristol Rovers and Swindon Town.

References

1894 births
1971 deaths
English footballers
Footballers from Newcastle upon Tyne
Wallsend F.C. players
Sheffield Wednesday F.C. players
Bristol Rovers F.C. players
Swindon Town F.C. players
English Football League players
Association football fullbacks